Pallesen is a Danish surname. Notable people with the surname include:

Kristoffer Pallesen (born 1990), Danish footballer
Per Pallesen (born 1942), Danish actor
Søren Pallesen (born 1977), Danish footballer
Trine Pallesen (born 1969), Danish actress, daughter of Per

Danish-language surnames